Kotobukiya may refer to
 Kotobukiya (toy company), a Japanese toy and hobby company founded in 1953 (and renamed to Kotobukiya in 1981) that makes model kits, action figures, and figurines, and owns IPs such as Frame Arms Girl
 Suntory, a large Japanese brewing and distilling company that was known as Kotobukiya during 1921–1963